Josef Adolf (14 May 1898 – 30 November 1951) was an Ethnic German Nordic combined skier who competed for Czechoslovakia in the 1920s.

Adolf was born in Velká Úpa (Pec pod Sněžkou), Austria-Hungary in May 1898. At the 1924 Winter Olympics he finished sixth in the Nordic combined event. He won a silver medal in the Nordic combined at the 1925 FIS Nordic World Ski Championships in Johannisbad.

He died in Viechtach, Germany on 30 November 1951, at the age of 53.

References

External links

Josef Adolf's profile at Sports Reference.com
Josef Adolf's profile at the Czech Olympic Committee 

1898 births
1951 deaths
People from Pec pod Sněžkou
People from the Kingdom of Bohemia
German Bohemian people
Sudeten German people
Czech male Nordic combined skiers
Czechoslovak male Nordic combined skiers
Olympic Nordic combined skiers of Czechoslovakia
Nordic combined skiers at the 1924 Winter Olympics
FIS Nordic World Ski Championships medalists in Nordic combined
Sportspeople from the Hradec Králové Region